This is a list of ingredients found in Thai cuisine.

Herbs and spices

Fresh herbs and spices

Dried herbs and spices

Pastes, sauces and condiments

Vegetables
{| class="wikitable sortable"
|-
!Image
!Thai name
!Thai script
!English name
!Description and use
|-
|
|Bai po
|ใบปอ
|Corchorus olitorius (Jute)
|The leaves are eaten blanched as a dish with khao tom kui (plain rice congee). The taste resembles that of spinach and samphire.
|-
|
|Bai yo
|ใบยอ
|Noni leaves
|Leaves are cooked with coconut milk in kaeng bai yo.
|-
|
|Buap hom
|บวบหอม
|Luffa aegyptiaca
|Used in stir-fries, in curries and in kaeng type soups.
|-
|
|Buap liam
|บวบเหลี่ยม
|Luffa acutangula 
|Used in stir-fries and in kaeng type soups.
|-
|
|Chaphlu
|ชะพลู, ช้าพลู
|Piper sarmentosum
|This leaf is used raw as a wrapper for the Thai dish Miang kham.
|-
|
|Fak thong
|ฟักทอง
|Kabocha
|Used in curries, stir-fries, soups, salads and sweets.
|-
|
|Hom daeng
|หอมแดง
|Shallot
|Shallots, not onions, are essential for Thai cuisine. They are used for making Thai curry pastes, salads, and certain condiments and pickles. They are also served raw on the side with certain dishes such as khao soi.
|-
|
|Kalam pli
|กะหล่ำปลี
|White cabbage
|In Thai cuisine, cabbage is often served raw on the side with Thai salads such as som tam or lap, steamed or raw with nam phrik, or boiled in soups and curries.
|-
|
|Khanaeng
|แขนง
|Cabbage sprouts
|The sprouts that come up from the roots after the main cabbage has been harvested, are simply called khanaeng, meaning "sprouts", or khanaeng kalam pli, "cabbage sprouts". They resemble and taste somewhat like brussels sprouts. It is often eaten stir-fried with, for instance, pork.
|-
|
|Khilek
|ขี้เหล็ก
|Senna siamea|The leaves, tender pods and seeds are edible, but they must be previously boiled and the water discarded. One of the most well-known preparations is kaeng khilek (แกงขี้เหล็ก).
|-
|
|Krachiap
|กระเจี๊ยบ
|Okra
|It is usually served blanched or raw together with a nam phrik (chilli dip), but it may be also served slightly barbecued or used in curries and stir-fried dishes.
|-
| 
|Makhuea phuang
|มะเขือพวง
|Pea eggplant
|This pea sized eggplant is often used in curries and is indispensable in nam phrik kapi, a chilli dip containing shrimp paste, where it is used raw.
|-
|
|Makhuea pro
|มะเขือเปราะ
|Thai eggplant
|About the size of a ping pong ball, these eggplants are used in curries or stir-fries, but they are also eaten raw with nam phrik (Chilli dips).
|-
|
|Makhuea thet
|มะเขือเทศ
|Tomato
|Literally meaning "foreign eggplant", it is used in salad such as Som tam, as an ingredient in stir-fries such as in Thai fried rice, but also cooked to a thick sauce as in the chilli paste nam phrik ong.
|-
|
|Mara
|มะระ
|Bitter melon or bitter gourd
|The small variety is most often eaten raw with nam phrik. Popular is tom chuet mara: bitter gourd in a clear broth, often stuffed with minced pork.
|-
|
|Marum
|มะรุม
|Drumstick 
|Most parts of the tree are edible: the long pods, the leaves, the flowers and the roots. Used in curries, stir-fries, soups, omelets, salads and also medicinal preparations.
|-
|
|No mai
|หน่อไม้
|Bamboo shoot
|Used in stir-fried dishes and Thai curries.
|-
|
|No mai farang
|หน่อไม้ฝรั่ง
|Green asparagus.
|Literally meaning "European bamboo shoot", green asparagus is used mainly in vegetable stir-fries.
|-
|
|Phak bung
|ผักบุ้ง
|Morning-glory or water spinach
|The large variety (phak bung chin) is mostly eaten stir-fried or in soup. The small variety (phak bung na) is generally served raw with som tam or with nam phrik.
|-
|
|Phak chi lom
|ผักชีล้อม   
|Oenanthe javanica|Eaten in soups, curries, stir-fries and also raw. This is one of the vegetables known as phak chi lom, the other is Trachyspermum roxburghianum.
|-
|
|Phak kat hongte
|ผักกาดฮ่องเต้
|Bok choy
|Used mainly in Thai-Chinese soups and stir-fries, this vegetable is known under several names in Thailand. Besides the aforementioned, it can also be called phak kat hongte, phak kwangtung hongte, and phak kwangtung Hong Kong. Hongte, derived from the Chinese Hokkien dialect, means "Emperor (of China)", and kwangtung is the Thai word for Guangdong, a province of China. The "Hong Kong" variety of bok choy is generally larger and sweeter than the bok choy known under the other names.
|-
|
|Phak kat khao
|ผักกาดขาว
|Chinese cabbage
|Literally "white cabbage", it is often eaten in soups and stir-fried dishes but also raw, sliced very thin, with certain spicy noodle soups or raw with nam phrik.|-
|
|Phak kat khiao
|ผักกาดเขียว
|Mustard greens
|Literally "green cabbage", it is often eaten in soups and stir-fried dishes.
|-
|
|Phak khana
|ผักคะน้า
|Chinese broccoli or Kai-lan
|Mostly eaten stir-fried with oyster sauce.
|-
|
|Phak khayaeng
|ผักแขยง
|Limnophila aromatica|Eaten raw with nam phrik. Popular in Isan.
|-
|
|Phak khom
|ผักขม, ผักโขม
|Amaranthus spp.|Used in salads and in soups like tom chap chai and tom kha mu. Mostly hybrids are offered in the market. The red-leafed Amaranth is known as phak khom bai daeng
|-
|
|Phak krachet 
|ผักกระเฉด
|Water mimosa
|Usually eaten raw with nam phrik. Popular in Isan.
|-
|
|Phak krathin
|ผักกระถิน
|Leucaena leucocephala|Tender pods or seeds are eaten raw with nam phrik.
|-
| 
|Phak kwangtung
|ผักกวางตุ้ง
|Choy sum
|Literally "Guangdong greens", it is often eaten in soups and stir-fried dishes.
|-
|
|Phak plang
|ผักปลัง
|Basella alba|Eaten in stir fries and curries such as kaeng liang.
|-
|
|Phak sian
|ผักเสี้ยน
|Spider plant
|The leaves are a popular food item fermented with rice water as phak sian dong pickle.
|-
|
|Phak waen
|ผักแว่น
|Marsilea crenata|Eaten raw with nam phrik. Popular in Isan.
|-
|
|Phak wan
|ผักหวาน
|Melientha suavis|Used in soups, mainly the sour soup of the kaeng type.
|-
|
|Riang  
|เหรียง
|Tree bean
|The young pods are edible.
|-
|
|Sato khao 
|สะตอข้าว   
|Stink bean
|The seeds of the Parkia speciosa (inside the pods) are usually eaten in stir fries.
|-
|
|Taengkwa
|แตงกวา
|Cucumber
|Typical Thai cucumbers are small. Eaten raw with nam phrik or as a som tam ingredient.
|-
|
|Talapat ruesi
|ตาลปัตรฤๅษี
|Limnocharis flava|Eaten in soups, curries and stir-fries. Popular in Isan.  It is popularly known as phak phai, not to be confused with phak phai, the leaves of Persicaria odorata, another type of edible leaf.
|-
|
|Thua fak yao
|ถั่วฝักยาว
|Yardlong beans
|A very versatile bean, it is used in curries and stir-fried dishes, but also served raw in som tam salad or together with a nam phrik (chilli dip).
|-
|
|Thua ngok
|ถั่วงอก
|Bean sprouts
|It is often eaten in soups and stir-fried dishes. Thais tend to eat bean sprouts raw to semi-raw, for instance in phat thai noodles where it is either sprinkled on top of the finished dish raw or added into the pan for one quick stir before serving
|-
|
|Thua phu
|ถั่วพู
|Winged bean
|Often eaten raw with nam phrik.
|-
|
|Thua rae
|ถั่วแระ
|Soybean
|Pods are boiled and seeds are eaten as a snack with salt.
|-
|
|
|
|
|
|}

Roots

Flowers and tree leaves

Edible fungi and algae

Fruits and nuts

Staple foods and other starches

Meat and poultry

Fish and seafood

Insects

Miscellanea

See also

 Thai cuisine
 List of Thai dishes
 List of Thai restaurants

References

Further reading
 Bhumichitr, Vatcharin. The Essential Thai Cookbook,'' 192 pages, New York: Clarkson N. Potter Inc., 1994

External links

 Golden Mountain Brand sauces
 Healthy Boy Brand sauces
 Tiparos Brand fish sauce
 Thai food glossary at Clay's Kitchen

Ingredients
Lists of foods by nationality